My Diary may refer to:

Books
My Diary, illustrated children's book by engraver Edmund Evans 1882 
My Diary 1915-17, by Benito Mussolini (English translation 1925)
My Diary, by Edith Holden, alternative title for The Country Diary of an Edwardian Lady
My Diary, by Marvel Comics 1950s in comics
My Diary, by "Jenny", pseudonymous post-nuclear war fiction by Yorick Blumenfeld 1983
My Diary, humour book by Gyles Brandreth 1986
My Diary..., various volumes by Sir William Howard Russell
Fragments from my Diary, by Maksim Gorky 1940

Music
My Diary, album by Indonesian band Mocca (band) 2002
My Diary (album), compilation album by R. Kelly 2005
"My Diary", single by Carol Connors (singer) 1961
"My Diary", single by Rosa Lee Parks from Jimi Hendrix discography 1965
"My Diary", song by Jim Jones from Harlem: Diary of a Summer 2005